Blackwell may refer to:

Places 
Canada
Blackwell, Ontario

United Kingdom
 Blackwell, County Durham, England
 Blackwell, Carlisle, Cumbria, England
 Blackwell (historic house), South Lakeland, Cumbria, England
 Blackwell, Bolsover, Alfreton, Derbyshire, England
 Blackwell, Somerset, a location
 Blackwell, Warwickshire, a location
 Blackwell, West Sussex, a location
 Blackwell, Worcestershire, England
 Blackwell in the Peak, Derbyshire, England

United States
 Blackwell, Oklahoma
 the Blackwell meteorite of 1906 which fell in Oklahoma (see Meteorite falls)
 Blackwell, Texas
 Blackwell, Virginia
 Blackwell, Missouri
 Blackwell House, New York
 Blackwell, Wisconsin, a town
 Blackwell (community), Wisconsin, an unincorporated community
 Blackwell Junction, Wisconsin, an unincorporated community
 Blackwell Lake, a lake in Minnesota
 Blackwell's Island, New York (till 1921; from 1921 to 1973 known as Welfare Island; now known as Roosevelt Island)

Other uses 
 Blackwell (surname)
 Blackwell UK, a chain of bookshops based in Oxford, England
 Blackwell Publishing, now part of Wiley-Blackwell
 Blackwell, a character in the manga series Gals!
 Blackwell (series), adventure games for the PC
 Blackwell (band), short-lived rock band from Houston, Texas, formed by John Bundrick in 1969
 Blackwell Academy, a fictional school in the game Life Is Strange.

See also 
 Backwell
 Blackwall (disambiguation)
 Blackwells (disambiguation)